Midnight in Saint Petersburg is a 1996 made-for-television thriller film starring Michael Caine for the fifth and final time as British secret agent Harry Palmer.

It served as a sequel to Bullet to Beijing, which had been released the year before, the two films having been shot back-to-back. Three previous films featuring Caine as Palmer were released in the 1960s, beginning with The Ipcress File.

Plot
Harry Palmer heads a private investigation business based in Moscow. His associates are Nikolai "Nick" Petrov (Jason Connery), ex-CIA agent Craig (Michael Sarrazin), and ex-KGB Colonel Gradsky (Lev Prygunov). They take on the job of finding 1000 grams of weapons-grade plutonium stolen from the Russian government, though they do not know the identity of their client.

This leads Harry back to Saint Petersburg, where (in Bullet to Beijing) he managed to make enemies of both of the leading rival gangsters, Alex (Michael Gambon) and Yuri (Anatoli Davydov). Nonetheless, suspecting that Alex is involved, Harry talks Yuri into helping him.

As a complication, Nick's ballerina girlfriend Tatiana (Tanya Jackson) is kidnapped by a gang working for Alex into order to pressure her father, the head curator of the Hermitage Museum, into helping steal valuable artwork for crooked art dealer Dr. Vestry (Serge Houde). Also in the mix is reporter Brandy (Michelle Burke), who turns out also to be working for Alex. Nick is captured when he goes looking for Tatiana, but manages to escape in time to assist Harry, with Yuri's help, foil both schemes.

Cast
Michael Caine as Harry Palmer
Jason Connery as Nikolai Petrov
Yuri Limonty as Circus Clown
Tanya Jackson as Tatiana Zavarzina
Michael Scherer (actor) as Mafiosa
Michelle Burke as Brandy
Gabriel Vorobyov as Driver
Michael Sarrazin as Craig Warner
Michael Gambon as Alexei Alexeyevich 
Lev Prygunov as Colonel Gradsky
Olga Anokhina as Greta 
Yuriy Petrov as General Kornikov
Anatoli Davydov as Yuri Stephanovich
Serge Houde as Dr. Armand Vestry
Ingolf Gorges as Club Manager
Evgeny Zharikov as Feodor Zavarzin 
Vera Bykova-Pizhel as Maria Zavarzina
Vladimir Yeryomin as Boris
John Dunn-Hill as Louis
Vlasta Vrana as Hans Schreiber
Mia Sara as Natasha

References

External links

1996 television films
1996 films
1990s spy thriller films
British sequel films
British spy thriller films
Films directed by Douglas Jackson
Films set in Russia
Russian sequel films
Russian spy thriller films
Russian television films
Spy television films
Television sequel films
British thriller television films
Films set in Moscow
Films set in Saint Petersburg
Films about the Russian Mafia
1990s British films